Jibran Masud (Arabic: جبران مسعود; born 1930) is a Lebanese writer, scholar and researcher. He first started writing at the age of 17, and managed to publish around 30 books by the age of 80. He wrote in different genres including stories and novels, and conducted linguistic and literary researches, and was nominated for a number of national and Arab literary awards for helping enrich the Arabic language.

Personal life 
Before he landed himself his current pseudonym, Masud was given "Ghibrial Masud" as his birth name. He was in his fourth year at the International College when he learned about his pseudonym. Masud registered to give out a speech about Lebanon when he noticed a change in his name among the list of reciters. He discovered that his professor, and the renowned poet, Fuad Suleiman, changed Masud's name to “Jibran Masud” so that it stands out as the Arabized version of "Ghibrial Masud." Since that day, Masud continues to be called by this pen-name.

Masud met his wife, Josephine Masud, who was also a writer, during his university years. They gave birth to four children; two of which are daughters and the other two sons, and most of whom live abroad, and lived for 35 years together before her passing away. Masud also has nine grandchildren.

Education 
In 1950, Masud graduated from American University of Beirut with a Bachelor of Science degree in Arabic Language and Literature and History with honors, and a Master's degree in Arabic literature, three years later.

He was mentored by prominent Lebanese poets, including Mishal Bashir and Fouad Suleiman, whom Masud looked up to as the second most influential literary role model, following his father.

Masud achieved a high proficiency in the English and French languages.

Career 
Masud is considered to be one of the building blocks of Arabic literature of his time. In 1947, and in response to the Arab issues occurring at the international level, 17-year-old Masud composed his first poem titled "Palestine". A year later, he published "Red Ashes," which is a book that sparked controversy among religious communities for rebelling against obsolete traditions, such as interfaith marriages that allows Muslim women to be married to men who are People of the Book, namely Christians. As a result, one of the religious schools in Lebanon prohibited its students from reading the book. Despite that, the book gained a wide recognition and was even featured by Maroon Abood on Radio Lebanon.

Before it was published in 1992, Masud dedicated 15 years of his life composing "Al-Ra’id," an extensive, linguistic lexicon . However, it was in 2016 when he broke new ground in the field of lexicography, which is by publishing "The Encyclopedia of Arabic Literature: its Eras, Arts and Most Renowned Figures,” and issued it in eight volumes. For 7 years, Masud compiled all the artistic characteristics of Arabic literature and its most renowned figures over the centuries; that is, starting from pre-Islamic period, the early years of Islam, up until the Umayyad era, the Abbasid era, and the Andalusian era. The encyclopedia also covers different poetry movements including Sufi and Chivalric poetry. In addition, Masud specialized a section of the encyclopedia for literary criticism, which adopted the methodology of discussing, analyzing and explaining literary texts from a literary, linguistic and graphical perspective, in attempt to draw out the beauty of the texts.

Masud founded the House of Wisdom publishing house (romanized: Bayt Al-Hikmah), which was known for publishing for a number of leading literary writers. Moreover, he has published a number of articles and researches, namely in the fields of literature, linguistics and history, in Lebanese newspapers.

Masud experienced a writer's block twice in his life. The first cause was the Lebanese Civil War which deprived him of the freedom to express himself genuinely, and, the second was the passing away of his wife. Once he broke free from the block, he vowed not to hold any political or diplomatic positions to devote his effort to writing only.

Works 
His major works include:

 “Red Ashes” (original title: Al-Ramad Al-Ahmar), Lebanon, 1948.
 "Al-Ra’id" extensive, linguistic lexicon (original title: Al-Ra’id Mu’jam Lughawi w-‘Asri), Dar El-Ilm Lilmalayin, Beirut, Lebanon, 1992.
 "The Standard Arabic: An Endless Flame” (original title: Al-‘Arabiya Al-Fus-ha Shu’la La Tantafi’), House of Wisdom, Beirut, Lebanon, 2001.
 "My Grandmother" (original title: Jidaty), Hachette Antoine, Beirut, Lebanon, 2010.
 "Angry Groans" (original title: Anin Al-Ghadab), Naufal Publishers, Beirut, Lebanon, 2012.
 "The Encyclopedia of Arabic Literature: its Eras, Arts and Most Renowned Figures” (original title: Mawsoo’at Al-Adab Al-‘Arabi: Fununoh wa-Usuroh wa-Ash-har A’lamuh), House of Wisdom, Beirut, Lebanon, 2016.

Awards 

 Nominated for the Friends of the Book award for composing "Al-Ra’id" extensive, linguistic lexicon, in Lebanon, 1965.
 Awarded the National Order of the Cedar medallion, 1970.

Positions 

 Arabic literature, Islamic philosophy, History and Geography professor, International College, Beirut, Lebanon.
 Manager of the Arabic courses in the French department, International College, Beirut, Lebanon.
 Arabic Language and Literature professor in the professional training program for Arab professors, American University of Beirut, Beirut, Lebanon.
 Islamic philosophy professor, American University of Beirut, Beirut, Lebanon.
 Arabic Language and Literature lecturer in the professional training program for Moroccan professors, Rabat, Morocco.

References 

Living people
1930 births
Lebanese male writers
Lebanese Arabists
Lebanese scholars
Arab lexicographers
American University of Beirut alumni